Sant Agustí may refer to:

Sant Agustí de Lluçanès, municipality in the comarca of Osona
Sant Agustí des Vedrà, village in the municipality of Sant Josep de sa Talaia, Ibiza